George Deane Mitchell (30 August 1894 – 11 January 1961) was an Australian politician and an Independent member of the New South Wales Legislative Assembly for a single term between 1941 and 1944.

Early life
Mitchell was born in Caltowie near Jamestown, South Australia and was the son of a railway porter. He was educated in Adelaide and worked as a clerk in Therbarton until 1914. Mitchell enlisted in the First Australian Imperial Force at the outbreak of World War One and served in the Middle East and France between 1914 and 1919. He reached the rank of Lieutenant and was awarded the Military Cross and Distinguished Conduct Medal. In the inter-war period Mitchell was a member of the Citizens' Military Forces and re-enlisted in the Second Australian Imperial Force with the rank of Captain at the commencement of World War Two. He reached the rank of Major and commanded an amphibious landing force in the New Guinea Campaign. Mitchell had several other occupations including potato farming in Dorrigo, owning a motor garage and car sales agency and script writing for the Australian film industry. He was an office holder in the Returned Services League.

State Parliament
Mitchell unsuccessfully contested the seat of Oxley as an Independent candidate at the 1938 state election. He was easily defeated by the United Australia Party incumbent member and Minister for Local Government and Public Works, Lewis Martin. Mitchell reversed the result with a surprise victory in the landslide defeat of Alexander Mair's conservative coalition government at the 1941 election. Mitchell was on extended leave from parliament due to active war service during much of the period following the election. The parliamentary convention was that members on active service were not opposed by candidates from major parties during elections. However, Les Jordan, a member of the Country Party and two other party members stood as "Independent Country" candidates. Jordan was victorious, and immediately joined the Country Party caucus. Mitchell then retired from public life.

References

 

1894 births
1961 deaths
Members of the New South Wales Legislative Assembly
20th-century Australian politicians
Australian recipients of the Military Cross
Australian recipients of the Distinguished Conduct Medal